The 2015 Sham Shui Po District Council election was held on 22 November 2015 to elect all 23 members to the Sham Shui Po District Council.

Veteran legislator Frederick Fung Kin-kee of the Hong Kong Association for Democracy and People's Livelihood (ADPL) lost his seat in Lai Kok to Chan Wing-yan of the Democratic Alliance for the Betterment and Progress of Hong Kong (DAB) and the Hong Kong Federation of Trade Unions (FTU).

Overall election results
Before election:

Change in composition:

References

External links
 Election Results - Overall Results

2015 Hong Kong local elections